Sick of the Studio '07 was a 2007 concert tour by American heavy metal band Metallica, which took place in Europe. The first four concerts were in festivals and the last eight in stadiums. The band held a tourname-competition among the fans and they personally chose the winning suggestion. The band did not play the "New Song" but the "Other New Song", which they had played on the previous tour (Escape from the Studio '06), was played at the Bilbao BBK Live Festival  The setlists of the tour were full of old songs. In Lisbon, Metallica performed "...And Justice for All" for the first time since October 1989.

On July 13, there was a power failure at the Denmark show and the PA went down. The recording of the show stopped. After the accident the band offered half of the show for a free download.

Typical setlist
(Taken from the Athens, Greece Rockwave Festival show on July 3, 2007)
 "Creeping Death"
 "Fuel"
 "Wherever I May Roam"
 "For Whom the Bell Tolls"
 "Welcome Home (Sanitarium)"
 "...And Justice for All"
 "The Memory Remains"
 "Disposable Heroes"
 "Orion"
 "Fade to Black"
 "Master of Puppets"
 "Battery"
 "Sad but True"
 "Nothing Else Matters"
 "One"
 "Enter Sandman"
 "Whiplash"
 "Seek & Destroy"

Tour dates

Songlist

Personnel
 James Hetfield – vocals, rhythm guitar
 Kirk Hammett – lead guitar
 Lars Ulrich – drums
 Robert Trujillo – bass

References

External links
Official website
Metallica on Tour
LiveMetallica.com
News post about the tour on Metallica.com

Metallica concert tours
2007 concert tours